Paranogmius is an extinct genus of prehistoric bony fish that lived during the Cenomanian. It is known from only 2 partial skulls and several dorsal vertebrae discovered in the Bahariya Formation that was destroyed during World War II. Since then, no more fossils have been discovered. It may have been up to 3 meters (10 feet) long.

Discovery and history 
The first and only remains of Paranogmius were discovered by crews working for Ernst Stromer in 1916 in the Gebel el Dist district of the Bahariya Oasis in Egypt, and were taken to the Palaeontological Museum, Munich. The remains consisted of just 2 partial posterior skulls and several vertebrae, and weren't fully described until 1935 by Wilhelm Weiler, naming it Paranogimus doederleini due to its similarities to Pentanogmius, and the species name after German Paleontologist Ludwig Döederlein. Weiler noted the great size of the remains, with one of the partial skulls, the type (BSPG 1912 VIII 99), preserved at 45 centimeters long. Paranogmius fossils were destroyed during the Bombing of Munich during the Second World War along with many other finds from Bahariya. Since 1935, no additional material has been described, although Concavotectum moroccensis may be synonymous.

Description 
Paranogmius was a Plethodid, meaning it likely had a large dorsal fin and a fusiform body like its relatives. Paranogmius also shares the triangular head shape, chewing plate, and wide snout with Plethodids like Pentanogmius. Paranogmius diagnostic differences from other Plethodids are mostly from the dentary and posterior skull region. The most remarkable feature of Paranogmius is its size, with estimates placing it at 3 meters long.

References

Tselfatiiformes
Late Cretaceous fish
Bahariya Formation
Fossil taxa described in 1935